Michael Opeyemi Bamidele CON (born 29 July 1963) popularly known as MOB, is a Nigerian lawyer, human right activist, politician and member of the 7th, 8th and 9th National Assembly consecutively representing Ekiti Central Senatorial District of Ekiti state at the Nigerian senate.

Early life
Bamidele was born on 29 July 1963, at Iyin Ekiti, a town in Ekiti State, southwestern Nigeria into the family of the late Sir Stephen Ogunjuyigbe Bamidele but spent his early life in Lagos State where he attended Baptist Academy secondary school and then Obafemi Awolowo University where he obtained a bachelor's degree in religious studies.
Bamidele later attended the University of Benin where he received a bachelor's degree in law in 1990. Having graduated from the Nigerian Law School, he was called to the bar in 1992.

Bamidele proceeded to Franklin Pierce University where he received a master's degree in law and was called to the New York Bar in January 1999. He was one of the defence counsel, led by Chief Godwin Olusegun Kolawole Ajayi to the Moshood Abiola on his treason trial.

Political life
In June 1992, he contested in the primary elections to the Federal House of Representatives representing Oshodi/Isolo Federal Constituency in Lagos State under the platform of Social Democratic Party but lost.
He served as special assistant on legal matters to Senator Bola Tinubu until November 1993 when Nigeria's democracy was truncated by the General Sanni Abacha.

In July 2000, he was appointed senior special assistant on political and intergovernmental relations to the Lagos State governor.

He was later appointed as commissioner for Lagos State Ministry of Youth, Sports and Social Development in governor Bola Tinubu's administration. In April 2011, he was elected as a member of the 7th National Assembly to represent Ekiti Central federal constituency 1. In March 2015, in his article entitled: “My hatred for Asiwaju Bola Tinubu”, criticized the released of The Lion of Bourdilion, a documentary film aired by Africa Independent Television on March 1, 2015, and the role played by the opposition party, in the release of the controversial film.

Previous Offices
 MHR (June 2011 to June 2015).
 Honorable Commissioner for Information and Strategy, Lagos State (July 2007 to February 2011).
 Honourable Commissioner for Youths, Sports and Social Development, Lagos State (July 2003 to May 2007)
 Special Adviser to the Governor on Political and Inter-Governmental Affairs, Lagos State (July 2000 to May 2003).

Awards and honours 
 Fellow, Chattered Institute of Arbitrators (Nigeria) 
 In October 2022, a Nigerian national honour of Commander Of The Order Of The Niger (CON) was conferred on him by President Muhammadu Buhari.

References

1963 births
Living people
Nigerian politicians
Baptist Academy alumni
University of Benin (Nigeria) alumni
Obafemi Awolowo University alumni
People from Ekiti State
Nigerian Law School alumni
20th-century Nigerian lawyers